Aleksandr Andreyevich Dumchev (born 27 October 1961) is a Soviet rower. At the 1988 Summer Olympics, he won a silver medal in the eight.

References 
 
 

1961 births
Living people
Russian male rowers
Soviet male rowers
Rowers at the 1988 Summer Olympics
Olympic silver medalists for the Soviet Union
Olympic rowers of the Soviet Union
Olympic medalists in rowing
Medalists at the 1988 Summer Olympics